The 17th Dogra Regiment was an infantry regiment of the British Indian Army. It was formed in 1922, after the Indian government decided to reform the army moving away from single battalion regiments to multi-battalion regiments. After the partition of India in 1947, it was allocated to the new Indian Army and renamed the Dogra Regiment.

Formation
 1st Battalion, formerly the 37th (Prince of Wales's Own) Dogras 
 2nd Battalion, formerly the 38th Dogras
 3rd Battalion, formerly the 1st Battalion, 41st Dogras
 10th (Training) Battalion, formerly the 2nd Battalion, 41st Dogras

Citations

General sources 
 Dogra Regiment on Bharat-Rakshak.com
 
 
 

British Indian Army infantry regiments
R
R
Military units and formations established in 1922